The Basilica and Maximus Convent of Nuestra Señora del Rosario, popularly known as the Convent of Santo Domingo (or Convent of the Holy Rosary), is a Catholic religious complex located in the city of Lima, Peru. 

It was created in the 1530s under the patronage of Our Lady of the Rosary and is located in the Historic Centre of Lima. It houses the relics of Rose of Lima and Martin de Porres, and was also where the University of San Marcos, officially the first Peruvian university and the oldest university in the Americas, began to function in the 16th century.

History 

The construction of the Convent of Santo Domingo took about 50 years. Its construction began during the foundation of Lima and concluded at the end of 16th century. It was the provincial Friar Tomás de San Martín, who began to carry out the construction of the first church of the Order, being later the superior Friar Sebastián de Ayllón that received aid of the King, finishing the work in the year of 1578.

The first building was completely destroyed by the earthquake of 1678. A new church was erected by Dominican architect Diego Maroto, and the convent was rebuilt, which had six cloisters and several courtyards before the earthquake of 1687. The church was rebuilt from the transept to the choir, the arches were changed and the number of windows was expanded. As a result, the church acquired breadth, simplicity and uniformity. The materials used in the construction were adobe, brick and calicanto, among others. The quincha served to lighten the weight, to make the structure more flexible and to increase the resistance to the earthquakes, so frequent in this region.

Because the earthquakes of 1687 and 1746 the set necessitated further modifications, such as the reconstruction of the tower, the main portal of the church and part of the convent, which included changes in the distribution of the cloisters, which is currently can appreciate.

The church was elevated to the category of Minor Basilica in 1930. The structure of the church was some damaged ten years later by an earthquake and restored in the later years. The convent's apple orchard would be lost to the changing course of the Rímac River.

The church

Exterior 
The exterior of the church was originally covered by bossage, as can be seen still at the base of the bell tower. A primitive portal, two bodies and three streets, was carved in the second half of the 17th century. In later years a new portal would rise because of the earthquakes that destroyed the church.

The church was restored after the Earthquake of Lima and Callao of 1940, that supposed the application of cement in the walls.

Bell tower 

The first bell tower of the church, of baroque style and three bodies, was designed together with the church by Diego Maroto in the second half of the 17th century and was destroyed during the earthquake of 28 of October 1746.

The present bell tower was conceived and designed by the Viceroy Manuel d'Amat i de Junyent in 1766 in the Rococo style, being in the bottom of octagonal form. It is divided into a lower body and two tall bodies with small balconies on corbels. At the top is the sculpture of a figure holding a trumpet, representing the angel who announces the Final Judgment. The total height is 46 meters, and is considered one of the most characteristic elements of the religious complex. The base of the bell tower still preserves the bossage that once covered the facade of the first church.

The total height is 46 meters. Its original color is white and pink, becoming the most characteristic and striking element of the religious set.

Description of its interior 

The church is divided in a main nave covered by rib vault and two lateral naves of interconnected and lantern chapels, in which also is the lateral portal of the church, the access to the tower and, next to the epistle, an entrance to the main cloister of the convent. The main nave has an additional entrance to the feet preceded by the narthex (space where religious instruction was given to the natives or those who were not baptized), on which is the high choir of the church.

Choir 
In the chorus of the church is the one that is considered the oldest ashlar masonry of the country. Completely worked in wood of cedar brought from Nicaragua, it is of Renaissance style, with Mannerist elements.

It has two sets of stalls: the first level was modernly sculpted, with the design based on the old. The originals are in the back, bearing in the back carvings of saints and other biblical characters. In the central part of the ashlar is the main seat of the prior of the convent, with carvings of Saint Dominic and Saint Francis of Assisi founders of the Dominicans and The Franciscans, respectively. The seat of the choir was carved by several artists among which Juan Martínez de Arrona (1562 -1635) would be outstanding.

Nave 

As mentioned previously, the enclosure is formed by three naves, of which the lateral ones are composed by chapels in which are located several reredos. On the side portal from left to right we find the following reredos or altarpieces: Next to the Gospel, the altarpieces of St. Hyacinth of Poland, Saint Joseph, Saint Dominic and Our Lady of the Rosary; and on the side of the Epistle those of the Peruvian Saints, the Souls, St. Thomas Aquinas, Sacred Heart, Chapel of the Lord of Justice and the Chapel of the Co-fraternity of the Rosary.

The most important is the altarpiece of the Peruvian Saints, of neoclassical style, located in the right transept of the church. In the center is the effige of St. Rose of Lima, to the left side this of St. Martin de Porres and to the right St. John Macias, that in spite of being born in the Iberian peninsula, is considered Peruvian because he developed his religious life in Lima. At the bottom of these images are reliquaries where the remains of each saint mentioned above rest. In the lower part of the altar there is a sculpture of St. Rose of Lima, made by the Maltese artist Melchor Caffá in 1669, on behalf of the Pope Clement IX to give it to the Dominican fathers for his beatification.

In the left transept is the altarpiece dedicated to the Patroness of Lima and titular of the church, Our Lady of the Rosary. In neoclassical style, it conserves in its main niche the effigy of this invocation "que fue la primera de este Reyno" (that she was the first one of this Kingdom). According to tradition it was given to Lima by King Charles V, Holy Roman Emperor. It was specially venerated by Rose of Lima and Martin de Porres, among others, and was crowned solemnly in the year 1927.

Presbytery 
The altar is of neoclassical style with decoration in turquoise and gold.

The Convent

Chapter house 

It is called the Chapter House because all the friars were gathered by chapters in order to choose their authorities and solve their problems, the room was made in the 17th century, in Baroque style by the Friar Diego Maroto member of the Order, architect born in Camarena (current province of Toledo, Spain). In 1551 in this same stage the University of San Marcos is inaugurated. Its existing tribune or chatedra is used in the 17th century to dictate classes or support thesis, made in the baroque style, has solomonic columns, presents a painting of St. Thomas Aquinas, to the front is a small reredos where the Christ of the agony is venerated, before which Martin de Porres was ecstatic and embraced to whom it was seen.

Guest room 

Here the fathers receive their authorities and relatives. The most noteworthy feature of this room is its artesonado ceilings dated to 1580, made of three thousand pieces held together by pressure without the use of nails. In this place the notes  of the National Anthem of Peru were composed by José Bernardo Alcedo.

Main cloister 
Composed of four galleries, decorated with Sevillian azulejos dating from 1604 and 1606; the paintings that present passages of the life of Saint Dominic, founder of the Dominican order, were contracted in 1608 by the provincial superior of the Order of Saint Dominic in Peru with the Sevillians Miguel Güelles, disciple of Juan de Uceda and his collaborator, Domingo Carro. At every corner of this cloister there is a reredos with biblical representations. These galleries have artesonado  ceilings carved of oak from Panama; the cloister also features a bronze home stoup, ordered to be built by the Dominicans, very famous for being where St. Martin de Porres, according to the writer Ricardo Palma, washed the bread of blond sugar turning it into white.

Library 

One of the most worthy places to visit is the library, not only for the value of the writing works, but also for the coffered ceilings. This hall houses the oldest books that the Dominicans used, being among these, incunables. The Library of the Convent has around 25,000 books, among them several bibliographical collections of great value.

Currently it is in the space of the old dining room.

Second cloister 
Of simpler construction, in a corner you can see a sculpture in marble from Carrara (Italy) that represents the Christ of the Column. Cloister composed of two floors; the first one presents arches with bossages, and the second floor with baluster of trilobulated arcs.

Chapel of St. Martin de Porres 

Place where St. Martin de Porres had its cell being destroyed by the earthquake of 1746. Due to the faithful and donations of the Church, a chapel is built in the place where he also had his nursery. It has an altar where its effige is venerated, having to its sides to Saint Dominic and St. Francis of Assisi and in the superior part the Virgin of the Rosary. In the burial rest his remains and an urn where the timbers of his bed are conserved. On the walls you can see paintings depicting Martin de Porres's miracles. In the back of the chapel is located his bedroom. Also it emphasizes the Oratory of the saint, small atmosphere under the stairs where Martin frequently prayed and was tempted by the devil. Today you can see the great amount of gifts brought to him by his faithful devotees. At the top is a wooden cross with which it is remembered that in this same place St. Martin removed the temptations of the evil one.

Tomb of Santa Rosa de Lima 
Located in the place that was an old cemetery where the first religious of the order were buried. An ossuary of several meters of depth where the bones of the time were placed. The tomb of marble where the remains of St. Rose of Lima are buried, are in the center of the environment that is decorated with mosaics. On a memorial plaque it reads: "Hago donación de mi cuerpo a mis hermanos Dominicos" (I make a donation of my body to my Dominican brothers). This phrase explains the gratitude of having belonged to the Tertiary Dominican Order.

Colegio de Santo Tomás de Aquino 
It was the year 1892 when the Dominican Order inaugurated the Colegio Santo Tomás de Aquino (College St. Thomas Aquinas), next to the convent of Santo Domingo, in the center of Lima. One hundred and twenty-five years later, the college retains its original location: Pasaje Rinconada de Santo Domingo 209, and still has a direct access from its main courtyard to the convent.

It is the first and only educational center in Lima to be founded by the Dominican fathers, being its first director Friar Jordán Revilla. The college is marked by the history of the city. In the jirón Camaná, the street parallel to the Pasaje Rinconada de Santo Domingo, are located the facilities of the Post Office of Lima and the Iglesia Santo Domingo, in turn, in the calle Conde de Superunda, behind the college, is what was the Post and Telegraphs Office of Lima, now Museum of Gastronomy.

The cloisters of the Convento de Santo Domingo, which are separated from the college only by a door, have a close relationship with the history of Education in Peru. It was founded in 1535 along with the city of Lima. There were the first classes of what is now the National University of San Marcos (UNMSM), also known as the Dean of the Americas. The frontis of Santo Tomás de Aquino has been mute witness of changes in the city. Several decades ago there was a parking car in front of the school; but later, the frontis was invaded by merchants that would form in that place the commercial center Polvos Azules.

In 1997, during the management of the defunct Alberto Andrade, this center would be relocated and the space would at today the Alameda Chabuca Granda. Another recent change in the infrastructure surrounding the college was the construction of the Puente Rayitos de Sol bridge, during the management of former mayor Luis Castañeda Lossio. This bridge connects to the Chabuca Granda mall with the Santa Rosa whereabouts on the Vía de Evitamiento road.

Today, a track is being built underneath the Rímac River, located opposite the college, which is part of the Vía Parque Rímac.

But the Colegio Santo Tomás de Aquino has also varied with time; in the beginning the college was only for men during more than 100 years; only from the year 1994 the admission for women was accepted, becoming a mixed educational center.

In addition, since 2010, Inés Rossi Rossi is the director of the college, a fact that for Aquinense college is a milestone in its history, since its creation always had only directors and belonging to the Dominican Order.

See also
 List of buildings in Lima

References

Bibliography 
 Juan Meléndez, O.P. "Tesoros Verdaderos de Indias", 1681.
 ''Collection “Documental del Perú”, Departamento de Lima, Volume XV, Third Edition, April 1973, "SANTO DOMINGO, Santa Rosa y San Martín de Porras descansan bajo su mole", pages 46–48.
 “ITINERARIOS DE LIMA” by Héctor Velarde, Patronage of Lima, Second Edition, 1990, "Convento e Iglesia de Santo Domingo", pages 37–41.
 "GUIDE TO PERU", Handbook for travelers, 6th. Edition, by Gonzalo de Reparaz Ruiz, publisher Ediciones de Arte Rep, Lima - Peru, Book published in English by the Tourism Promotion Fund of Peru - FOPTUR, "SANTO DOMINGO (Church and Convent of)", pages 102-103
 Felipe Acosta Burga, "Atractivos de Lima", Publisher National Police of Peru, Lima, 1997.
 Convento de Santo Domingo, "Álbum del Convento de Santo Domingo en el cuarto centenario de su fundación con la ciudad de Lima, 18 de enero de 1535-18 de enero de 1935", Publisher Excelsior, Lima, 1935.
 Genealogical information of Friar Diego Maroto, Dominican, native to Camarena (Toledo Province), pretender to notary of the Court of the Inquisition of Lima 1660–1662. document published by the Ministry of Education of Spain. Located by Gabriela Lavarello de Velaochaga

External links 

 Order of Preachers of Peru, Dominican Community
 Radio Santa Rosa
 Colegio Santo Tomás de Aquino

Roman Catholic churches in Lima
1530s establishments in the Spanish Empire
Roman Catholic churches completed in 1766
Rococo architecture in Peru
Mudéjar architecture
Dominican convents
Basilica churches in Peru
Azulejos in Peru
Burials in Peru
Libraries in Peru
18th-century Roman Catholic church buildings in Peru
Cultural heritage of Peru